Sune Berg Hansen (born 21 April 1971) is a Danish chess grandmaster. He is a seven-time Danish Chess Champion.

Chess career
Hansen earned his international master title in 1993 and his grandmaster title in 1998. He has won the Danish Chess Championship on seven occasions: in 2002, 2005, 2006, 2007, 2009, 2012 and 2015. He has competed in eight Chess Olympiads: in 1994, 2000, 2002, 2004, 2006, 2010, 2012 and 2016. He has also competed in six European Team Chess Championships: in 2005, 2007, 2009, 2011, 2013 and 2015. As of September 2017, he has a rating of 2580, which makes him the No. 3 ranked Danish player.

Personal life
Born in Gentofte, Hansen holds a cand.polit. from the University of Copenhagen and has been a professional poker player since 2005. He is also a day trader and writes a chess and poker column for the Danish newspaper Politiken. He founded the Danish PokerNet website, which was acquired by the RakeTech Group in 2017.

References

External links

1971 births
Living people
Chess grandmasters
Danish chess players
Danish poker players
People from Gentofte Municipality
University of Copenhagen alumni